The Ahmedabad Town Hall, officially Sheth Mangaldas Girdhardas Memorial Hall, is an auditorium in Ahmedabad, India. It is named after Mangaldas Girdhardas, a textile industrialist.

History 
The town hall was constructed in 1930s as a memorial to Mangaldas Girdhardas, a noted textile industrialist in the 20th century, with funds donated by the citizens. It is owned by the Ahmedabad Municipal Corporation.

It was renovated in the 1960s under B. V. Doshi. He had opted for a false ceiling for better acoustics.

Extensive renovation was carried out in 1997-98 under architect Kamal Mangaldas, a grandson of Mangaldas Girdhardas. He removed the false ceiling and added a podium around the original building.

Architecture 
The town hall was designed by British architect Claude Batley in 1939, who also designed the M. J. Library next to it.

It is an example of an Art Deco building. The plan of the building is designed by using two rotating squares placed at 45 degrees forming a star-shape. The resulting octagonal space is designed as a seating area. Rectangles are added to the front and rear of the central square which formed a vestibule and a stage respectively. The star-shaped building is capped by a dome on an octagonal space. The whole plan takes inspiration from the mandapas of Gujarati Hindu temples. The exterior has exposed bricks with stepped back corners invoking the complex exterior of Hindu temples.

The thick walls were constructed from bricks and an octagonal concrete dome was constructed over it. The Chhajja and ornate grills in the structure show influence of Gujarati architectural heritage.

See also 
 Tagore Memorial Hall
 Vijali Ghar

References

External links
 Building plan drawings

Auditoriums in India
Buildings and structures in Ahmedabad
British colonial architecture in India
Art Deco architecture in India
Buildings and structures completed in 1938
Māru-Gurjara architecture